Erik Kenneth Edman (born 11 November 1978) is a Swedish former professional footballer who played as a defender. Starting off his career with Helsingborgs IF in 1997, he went on to represent clubs in Italy, Germany, the Netherlands, England, and France before retiring at Helsingborg in 2013. A full international between 2001 and 2009, he won 57 caps for the Sweden national team and represented his country at the 2002 FIFA World Cup, UEFA Euro 2004, and the 2006 FIFA World Cup.

Club career

Early career
Edman played for a number of clubs during his career. He played for Helsingborgs IF until 1999, which was his first time leaving Sweden and moved abroad. In 2001, after having unremarkable spells at Italian club Torino and Karlsruher SC in Germany, Edman returned to Sweden and joined AIK for one season. After that, Heerenveen in the Netherlands brought Edman from Sweden.

Tottenham Hotspur
In July 2004, Tottenham Hotspur signed Edman from Heerenveen. Edman quickly established himself at the club, and will probably be best remembered at Spurs for his stunning goal, which he scored from 41 yards out, in the Premier League match against Liverpool in April 2005. However, in the summer of 2005, the arrival of South Korean left back, Lee Young-Pyo, led Edman to make the decision to leave England.

Rennes
In the last week of August, Spurs accepted an offer from French club Rennes. It did not take long for Edman to impress his new manager, László Bölöni, and once again established himself as first choice at left-back.

Wigan Athletic
In January 2008, Edman was signed by Wigan Athletic for a transfer fee of £500,000. The arrival of Edman was a good deal for Wigan Athletic, since the club did not find a good replacement after the departure of Leighton Baines, the previous summer. In March 2008, Edman was injured in a match against Blackburn Rovers, damaging his anterior crutiate ligament in his knee. This means he missed the rest of Wigan's season, as well as Euro 2008. Edman made his return to the Wigan team, as a substitute in January 2009 at Old Trafford, as Wigan lost 1–0 to Manchester United. However, he has lacked playing time, due to injuries and Maynor Figueroa's impressive performances throughout the season, which have earned him a spot in Roberto Martínez's starting eleven. Edman played his last game in the Latics' 9–1 loss against Tottenham Hotspur in November, where he had a torrid time against Aaron Lennon.

Helsingborgs IF
On 5 February 2010, Helsingborgs IF confirmed that they had re-signed Edman. Edman signed a five-year contract with the Swedish club. In December 2012 it was announced Edman would take up a coaching position at Helsingborgs IF.

International career
Edman was a part of the Sweden national team setup from 2001 until 2009. In 2002, he was part of Sweden's 2002 World Cup squad, but did not make any appearances. He then began to feature more regularly for Sweden after the 2002 World Cup, and at Euro 2004 and the 2006 World Cup, he featured as a starting left back for the team.

He scored his first and only goal, a free kick, in a 2006 World Cup qualifier against Bulgaria at the Vasil Levski National Stadium in March 2005.

Edman missed UEFA Euro 2008 due to a serious knee injury. He retired from the national team the following year.

Career statistics 

Scores and results list Sweden's goal tally first, score column indicates score after each Edman goal.

Honours
Helsingborgs IF
Allsvenskan: 1999, 2011
Svenska Cupen: 1998, 2010, 2011
Svenska Supercupen: 2011, 2012
Individual
Swedish Defender of the Year: 2004

References

External links

Erik Edman Rennes profile
Erik Edman profile  at svenskfotboll.se 

1978 births
Living people
Swedish footballers
Association football defenders
Sweden international footballers
Sweden youth international footballers
Sweden under-21 international footballers
Landskrona BoIS directors and chairmen
2002 FIFA World Cup players
UEFA Euro 2004 players
2006 FIFA World Cup players
Allsvenskan players
2. Bundesliga players
Eredivisie players
Premier League players
Ligue 1 players
Helsingborgs IF players
Torino F.C. players
Karlsruher SC players
AIK Fotboll players
SC Heerenveen players
Tottenham Hotspur F.C. players
Stade Rennais F.C. players
Wigan Athletic F.C. players
Swedish expatriate footballers
Swedish expatriate sportspeople in Italy
Expatriate footballers in Italy
Swedish expatriate sportspeople in Germany
Expatriate footballers in Germany
Swedish expatriate sportspeople in the Netherlands
Expatriate footballers in the Netherlands
Swedish expatriate sportspeople in England
Expatriate footballers in England
Swedish expatriate sportspeople in France
Expatriate footballers in France
Sportspeople from Jönköping